Yanko Tihov (born 1977, Burgas, Bulgaria) is a British and Bulgarian painter and printmaker.

Biography 

Yanko Tihov attended the National Academy of Arts in Sofia from 1997 to 2001, before moving to London, UK.

He won prizes at Royal Institute of Oil Painters ROI (2004, 2007), Runner up of the Discerning Eye Exhibition (2008), Printmaking Ex Libris Award in Argentina (2001).

He has exhibited at The Royal Academy of Arts Summer Exhibition, Royal Institute of Oil Painters, Royal Society of Portrait Painters, Lynn Painter-Stainers Prize, Tokyo Printing Triennial, The Iowa Biennial Exhibition of Contemporary Miniature Prints and others. His work can be seen at private galleries and art fairs. Tihov's works include portraits and surreal urban images.
His portrait of the Indian artist and Film Director M. F. Husain was featured in 2014 BP Portrait Award at the National Portrait Gallery in London.

Tihov lived in Notting Hill, London, before relocating to Bounds Green, Enfield in 2014.

In 2015 Tihov made ‘The London Passport Map', a digital edition hand painted with 23ct gold.  The map was shown at Christie’s South Kensington, London. The London Passport Map was made from 32 different passports of the most common non-British nationalities in each London borough based on data from the 2011 census.

Exhibitions and collections 

 1st Exlibris Contest Acqui Terme Rotary Club, Italy
 3rd International Triennial Of Printmaking, Sofia, Bulgaria
 4th International Graphic competition, Gliwice, Poland
 11th Printmaking Biennial Varna, Bulgaria
 21st Mini Print International, Cadaques, Spain
 13th Exlibris small graphic exhibition Sint-Niklaas, Belgium
 Asociacion Cultural Sanmartina de Gral.S.Martin, Argentina
 2nd Competition Biblioteca Comunale di Lomazzo, Italy
 Exlibris Ville d’issy-les- Moulineaux, France
 The Open Eye Gallery, Edinburgh, Scotland
 14th Exlibris small graphic exhibition Sint-Niklaas, Belgium
 5th International Graphic competition Gliwice, Poland
 Royal Society Of Portrait Painters Exhibition, London, UK
 Royal Academy Of Arts, Summer Exhibition, London, UK
 The Pastel Society, London, UK
 Royal Institute Of Oil Painters Exhibition, London, UK
 Leonardo Sciascia Prize, Venice, Rome, Florence, Milan, Italy
 3rd Competition Biblioteca Comunale di Lomazzo, Italy
 The Iowa Biennial Exhibition of Contemporary prints, Iowa, USA
 Jill George Gallery, The Figure Show, London, UK
 ING Discerning Eye, Drawing Bursary, London, UK
 Lynn Painter-Stainers Prize, London, UK
 Lisa Sharpe Contemporary Art, One Alfred Place, London, UK
 Jack Fine Art, London, UK
 TAG Fine Arts, London, UK

Notes

References 
 Who's Who In Art, 2008 33rd Edition, Hilmarton Manor Press, Page 987
 Artist Finder
 Who's Who In Art, 2008 33rd Edition, Hilmarton Manor Press, Page 987
 Who's Who In Art, 2008 33rd and 34th Edition 2010, Hilmarton Manor Press, 
 Royal Society of Portrait Painters Exhibition
 Tokyo Printing Triennial
 The Iowa Biennial Exhibition of Contemporary Prints
 Jack Fine Art
 Saatchi Online
 Lisa Sharpe Contemporary Art

External links 
 

1977 births
Living people
Bulgarian painters
Bulgarian printmakers
Bulgarian expatriates in the United Kingdom
People from Burgas